The Ishaqzai  (Ey-sock-zah-ye) is an Afghan tribe of Abdālī clan (later Durrani) of the Pashtun people.  They are known to populate the South-west of Afghanistan, particularly the provinces of Farah, Nimruz, Helmand, Kandahar and Herat. One of the main leaders has been Sher Ahmad Haqyar, who lives in Kandahar. He was member of parliament Afghanistan during the reign of Mohammed Zahir Shah, who was deposed in 1973.

See also 
 Alizai (Pashtun tribe)

References

Durrani Pashtun tribes
Ethnic groups in Helmand Province
Ethnic groups in Kandahar Province
Ethnic groups in Herat Province
Ethnic groups in Farah Provence
Ethnic groups in Ghor Province
Ethnic groups in Nimruz Province